XPN may refer to:
 XPN (newsreader), a Usenet news client software application
 WXPN, a public radio station from Philadelphia, Pennsylvania, United States